"She's So Lovely" is the debut single by English pop rock band Scouting for Girls. It was written by band frontman Roy Stride and produced by Andy Green and released on 27 August 2007 as the lead single from their self-titled debut studio album (2007).

The song peaked at number seven on the UK Singles Chart and  also reached a peak of number six on the UK Download Chart. The song remained in the UK top 10 for six consecutive weeks.

Music video
The music video for "She's So Lovely" is set in a bowling alley. Roy Stride is trying to attract the attentions of a pretty girl (Louise Glover), but she has a boyfriend (Liyo Cassini) already. While the boyfriend is there, Roy tells the girl she looks beautiful. The boyfriend gets angry, but gets called away for his throw. As he scores a strike, Roy and the girl walk off down the hall together (although only their legs are shown, the shoes and jeans are the same as Roy's).

Track listing
CD single
"She's So Lovely"
"Murder Mystery"

7" vinyl #1
"She's So Lovely"
"Wonderful Life"

7" vinyl #2 (Blue)
"She's So Lovely" (live)
"It's Not About You" (live)

Charts

Weekly charts

Year-end charts

Certifications

Use in the media
The popularity and catchy nature of the song has seen it used in numerous commercials and television series. The song was heard in TV spots for the American comedy series Ugly Betty. An alternative version of the song was featured in series 2 of the BBC television series Gavin & Stacey and in the British film Angus, Thongs and Perfect Snogging, in a scene where the main character Georgia is dressed as a stuffed olive. It has also been used in LACVERT's commercial for their lipstick, Ice Kiss, featuring the Olympic gold medalist Kim Yuna. The Stubborn skit in Gag Concert uses the song too.

Instrumentals from the track are currently being used in TV spots in the United States for VoIP provider Vonage.

References

2007 songs
2007 debut singles
Scouting for Girls songs
Songs written by Roy Stride
Epic Records singles